The Ulm Einsatzkommando trial (1958) was the first major trial of Nazi crimes under West German law (rather than by an international or military tribunal). Ten suspects, former members of the Einsatzkommando Tilsit, were charged for their involvement in war crimes committed in Lithuania, in 1941. All were convicted as accessories to mass murder and were sentenced to various terms in prison, the chief perpetrators being held to be those from whom the orders had come down.

In light of the trial, Konrad Adenauer set up the Central Office of the State Justice Administrations for the Investigation of National Socialist Crimes.

References

Holocaust trials
Trials in Germany
1958 in West Germany